Erik Miller (born March 6, 1974) is an American lightweight rower. He won a gold medal at the 2000 World Rowing Championships in Zagreb with the lightweight men's eight.

References

1974 births
Living people
American male rowers
World Rowing Championships medalists for the United States